Doris J. Johnson (born June 23, 1923) is an American former politician in the state of Washington. Johnson served in the Washington House of Representatives as a Democrat from the 16th District, as well as the 8th District. A school counselor, Johnson attended Western Washington State College and earned a master's degree in education. She was raised in Bellingham, Washington. She married Harold Johnson and had a daughter, Adra Ann, and lives in Kennewick.

References

1923 births
Living people
Women state legislators in Washington (state)
Democratic Party members of the Washington House of Representatives
21st-century American women